Friedrich Gottlieb Dietrich (1765 or 1768 – 1850) was a German botanist. He used the author abbreviation F.Dietr. He wrote the book Die Weimarische Flora in 1800 and over 30 editions of Vollständiges Lexicon der Gärtnerei und Botanik between the years of 1802 and 1840.

References

18th-century German botanists
1760s births 
1850 deaths
19th-century German botanists